Rize Province is a province of northeast Turkey, on the eastern Black Sea coast between Trabzon and Artvin. The province of Erzurum is to the south. It was formerly known as Lazistan, the designation of the term of Lazistan was officially banned in 1926, by patriots. The capital is the city of Rize.

The province is home to Laz, Hemshin, Turkish people and Georgian communities.

Etymology
The name comes from Greek  (riza), meaning "mountain slopes". The Georgian, Laz, and Armenian names are all derived from Greek as well: their names in respective order are Rize (რიზე), Rizini (რიზინი), and Rize (Ռիզե).

History

Ancient history

We have little information as to the prehistory of this region, which being covered in thick forest is difficult to excavate and reveals little. Colchis which existed from the 13th to the 1st centuries BC is regarded as an early proto-Georgian polity in this area.

Antiquity
According to Pliny the Elder, from 670 BC onwards the Aegean Ancient Greek community of Miletus established a series of trading posts along the Black Sea coast; one of these was Rize. in the mid-6th century BC The tribes living in the southern Colchis (Tibareni, Mossynoeci, Macrones, Moschi, and Marres) were incorporated into the nineteenth Satrapy of Persia. The Achaemenid Empire was defeated by Alexander the Great, however following of Alexander's death a number of separate kingdoms were established in Anatolia, including Pontus, in the corner of the south-eastern Black Sea, ruled by Mithridates. Rize was brought into the Kingdom of Pontus by Pharnaces in 180 BC. The very small number of Hellenistic Greek inscriptions that have been found anywhere in Pontus suggest that Greek culture did not substantially penetrate beyond the coastal cities and the court. The kingdom was absorbed into the Roman Empire between 10 AD and 395 AD, when it passed to the Byzantines. By this time writers including Pliny and the Roman adventurer Arrian were describing the inhabitants as Laz.

Medieval

During the whole medieval period, the region was under Byzantine control, and was mainly populated by Greeks and indigenous Lazs. During the reign of the Byzantine emperor Justinian I ( 527–565) the warlike tribes of the interior, called Sannoi or Tzannoi, the ancestors of modern Laz people, were subdued, Christianized and brought to central rule. Locals began to have closer contact with the Greeks and acquired various Hellenic cultural traits, including in some cases the language. Locals were under nominal Byzantine suzerainty in the theme of Chaldia, with its capital at Trebizond, governed by the native semi-autonomous rulers, like the Gabras family. Following the Seljuk Turks invasion, there has been continuous influx of Armenians resulting partial Armenization of the local Tzan population and formation of new Hemshin identity.

With the Georgian intervention in Chaldia and collapse of Byzantine Empire in 1204, Empire of Trebizond was established along the southwestern coast of the Black Sea, populated by a large Lazian-speaking population. In the eastern part of the same empire, an autonomous coastal theme of Greater Lazia was established. Byzantine authors, such as Pachymeres, and to some extent Trapezuntines such as Lazaropoulos and Bessarion, regarded the Trapezuntian Empire as being no more than a Lazian border state. Though Greek in higher culture, the rural areas of Trebizond empire appear to have been predominantly Laz in ethnic composition. Laz family names, with Hellenized terminations, are noticeable in the records of the mediaeval empire of Trebizond, and it is perhaps not too venturesome to suggest that the antagonism between the "town-party" and the "country-party," which existed in the politics of "the Empire," was in fact a national antagonism of Laz against Greek.

In 1282, kingdom of Imereti besieged Trebizond, however after the failed attempt to take the city, the Georgians occupied several provinces and all the Trebizontine province of Lazia threw off its allegiance to the king of the 'Iberian' and 'Lazian' tribes and united itself with the Georgian Kingdom of Imereti.

The Ottoman era

Laz populated area was often contested by different Georgian principalities, however through Battle of Murjakheti (1535), Principality of Guria finally ensured control over it, until 1547, when it was conquered by resurgent Ottoman forces and reorganized into the Lazistan sanjak as part of eyalet of Trabzon.

From the late-17th century onwards, the Ottoman administration built many elegant bridges across the Fırtına River and its tributaries.

The province was a site of battles between Ottoman and Russian armies during Caucasus Campaign of World War I and was occupied by the Russian forces in 1916–1918. It was returned to the Ottomans with the Treaty of Brest-Litovsk in 1918.

From 1924 onwards, Rize has been a province of the Republic of Turkey. Until tea was planted here in the 1940s this was a poor area at the far end of the country, with only the Soviet Union beyond the Iron Curtain. Many generations of Rize people left to look for jobs in Istanbul or overseas.

In Turkey 
In September 1935 the third Inspectorate General (Umumi Müfettişlik, UM) was created, to which the Rize province was included. Its establishment was based on the Law 1164 from June 1927, which was passed in order to Turkefy the population. The third UM span over the provinces of Erzurum, Artvin, Rize, Trabzon, Kars, Gümüşhane, Erzincan and Ağrı. It was governed by an Inspector General seated in the city of Erzurum. The Inspectorate General was dissolved in 1952 during the Government of the Democrat Party.

Life in Rize today
The city of Rize is a coastal town on a narrow strip of flat land between the mountains and the sea. Today the area is wealthier although there is a marked difference between the lifestyle of the people in the relatively wealthy city of Rize and those in the remote villages where wooden houses perch on the steep mountainside with the rain beating down. The province is known in Turkey for the production of Rize tea.

Geography

Rize is located between the Pontic Mountains and the Black Sea. It is considered to be the "wettest" corner of Turkey and is the country's main tea producing region. In addition to tea, the region is also known for growing kiwi fruit.  The province is largely rural and very scenic, containing many mountain valleys and elevated yaylas (meadows). The district of Çamlıhemşin is one of Turkey's most popular venues for trekking and outdoor holidays. Roads are scarce in some of the more remote regions, so electrical powered cable cars have been installed to transport people and supplies into the mountains. Summers are cool (July average 22 °C) and winters are mild (January average 7 °C) with high levels of precipitation all year long.

The new Black Sea coast road has made Rize more accessible, but has drawn criticism for its negative effect on the region's wildlife. Since the early 2000s, Rize has seen an increase in visitors from outside the province, particularly tourist from urban areas. This increase in tourism has raised concerns among locals that the traditional way of life and the unblemished character of the natural surroundings is being endangered. The provincial governor, Enver Salihoglu (as of 2005) has stated his opposition to the expansion of the road network and has advocated a commercial focus on beekeeping, trout farming, and the growing of organic teas.

Native plants include the Cherry Laurel, the fruit of which is an edible small dark plum that leaves a dark stain on the mouth and teeth. In addition, the Bilberry, which are now being actively cultivated, can be found growing the region. Rize is traversed by the northeasterly line of equal latitude and longitude.

Mountains

Notable mountains
 Kaçkar (3.937 m)
 Barut (3.251 m)
 Ziglat (3.511 m)
 Verçenik (3.711 m)
 Hipot (3.560 m)

Rivers
From east to the west
 Fındıklı Deresi
 Büyükdere
 Pazar Suyu
 Karadere
 İyidere

Districts

Rize province is divided into 12 districts, including the capital district Rize:
 Ardeşen
 Çamlıhemşin
 Çayeli
 Derepazarı
 Fındıklı
 Güneysu
 Hemşin
 İkizdere
 İyidere
 Kalkandere
 Pazar
 Rize

Geology
Part of the Pontic Mountains (Eastern Black Sea Mts.), Rize was formed in the Palaeozoic period. Valleys first appeared during the Cretaceous period and have since expanded due to erosion.

Climate

The region's climate is characterized by relatively mild to warm temperatures and evenly distributed precipitation throughout the year.  The Köppen Climate Classification subtypes for this climate are Cfa (Humid Subtropical Climate) and Cfb (Oceanic Climate).

Culture

Cuisine

Traditional cuisine in the city quite rich and the anchovy forms the basic for many of the dishes peculiar to the region. Soups, salads, pilafs and even desserts are made of anchovy. Some of the local dishes are hamsi buğulama (boiled anchovy), hamsi stew, and kamsi köfte (anchovy meatballs). Lahana çorbası (cabbage soup), muhlama (made of cheese, cornmeal and butter) and pides (pita bread topped with various fillings) are also other local delicacies.

Rize tea 

Rize tea is a major agricultural product to the region and has changed the local economy. Rize Province is also one of the largest consumers of Rize tea too. 

The province of Rize has prided itself of being the largest tea producer within Turkey. In 2021, the Rize Commerce Exchange started the construction of a seven-floor building in the shape of the traditional tulip-shaped tea glasses called ince belli, in hopes to boost local tourism.

Folk dances and traditional costumes
Folk dancers perform horon energetically when it is accompanied by kemenche. However this folk dance can also be accompanied by Tulum or kaval. Folk dancers wear traditional costumes while performing horon. Men wear shirt, vest, jacket, zipka (pants made of wool and gathered at knees) and black boots. On the other hand, women dancers wear colorful dresses and traditional hand painted head scarves including various motifs.

Handicrafts
Rize offers a rich variety of traditional handicrafts and handmade souvenirs to visitors. Some of them include: copper works, wicker baskets, butter churns, woven socks, shoulder bags, and spoon made of boxwood. Linen of Rize (Turkish: Rize Bezi) is a handwoven textile and is often used as part of the under layer of a dress. Kemençe is a traditional 3-stringed string instrument which is made in this province.

Places of interest

Sites in the province include:
 Pokut Yaylası - The most touristic yayla in Rize Province.
 Ayder - A yayla (high meadow) area with hot springs, hotels and restaurants, and from here you can climb up to higher and more remote meadows and villages.
 Çamlık - riverside area of forest park
 Fırtına Vadisi - the valley is now a protected site
 Gelin Tülü Şelalesi - a waterfall in Yukarışimşirli, Çamlıhemşin district.
 Palovit Şelalesi - a scenic waterfall in Çamlıhemşin district.
 Ovit - mountain pass on the Erzurum road in Ikizdere, forest and mountain viewpoint
 The village and waterfall of Palovit, high in the mountains.
 Avup Dağı, the mountain between Rize and Çamlıhemşin, between Fırtına Deresı and Ortaköy Deresi. There are four Byzantine castles situated high on rocks on the mountainside including;
 Kale-i Balâ and Zilkale
 Huser Yaylası - Huser plateau is connected to Çamlıhemşin district of Rize. Huser Plateau, one of the highest plateaus of the Black Sea, must be visited with its unique view.

Other buildings of note include:
 The watch tower, Kız Kalesi on the sea front in Pazar.
 Zilkale, "bell tower" near the village of Şenköy in the district of Çamlıhemşin
 Fırtına River bridges

Notable people
 

Davut Kavranoğlu, scientific adviser

See also
Kaçkar Mountains
Limanköy, Çayeli
Lazistan

References

External links

  Rize governor's official website
  Rize municipality's official website
  Rize weather forecast information
  Rize Tourism Guide
 Culture and travel Trabzon and Rize
 Rize photo gallery

 
States and territories established in 1924
Tao-Klarjeti